Frankie Conley (October 4, 1890 – August 21, 1952) was a bantamweight boxing champion.

Biography
He was born on October 4, 1890 in Platania, Calabria, Italy as Francesco Conte. He became the bantamweight boxing champion of the world when he knocked out Monte Attell in 42 rounds on February 22, 1910.

In 1912 he was knocked out by Mexican Joe Rivers.

He died on August 21, 1952 in Kenosha, Wisconsin.

References

External links
 

Bantamweight boxers
World bantamweight boxing champions
1890 births
1952 deaths
Italian emigrants to the United States
American people of Italian descent
American male boxers
Sportspeople from Kenosha, Wisconsin